Nebraska Highway 98 is a highway in the northeastern part of the U.S. state of Nebraska.  Its western terminus is at an intersection with Nebraska Highway 13 in Pierce.  Its eastern terminus is at an intersection with Nebraska Highway 35 west of Wayne.

Route description
Nebraska Highway 98 begins in Pierce at an intersection with NE 13.  It heads eastward away from Pierce into farmland where it meets with US 81.  NE 98 runs concurrently northward with US 81 for about  before splitting off and continuing to the east.  It passes NE 57 south of Carroll.  The highway terminates about a mile later at an intersection with NE 35.

Major intersections

References

External links

The Nebraska Highways Page: Highways 61 to 100
Nebraska Roads: NE 81-100

098
Transportation in Pierce County, Nebraska
Transportation in Wayne County, Nebraska